Hong Hyun-hui (born 27 December 1991) is a South Korean tennis player.

Hong has a WTA singles career high ranking of 440 achieved on 22 December 2014. She also has a WTA doubles career high ranking of 424 achieved on 24 August 2015.

Hong received a main draw wildcard into the singles draw of the 2012 Hansol Korea Open where she lost to Galina Voskoboeva in the first round.

Playing for South Korea in Fed Cup, Hong has a W/L ratio of 0–3.

ITF Finals

Singles (1–2)

Doubles (3–0)

External links 
 
 
 

1991 births
Living people
South Korean female tennis players
21st-century South Korean women